Groovin' with the Chet Baker Quintet is an album by trumpeter Chet Baker which was recorded in 1965 and released on the Prestige label.

Reception

Allmusic rated the album with 3 stars.

Track listing 
All compositions by Richard Carpenter and Gladys Bruce except as indicated
 "Madison Avenue" - 5:51
 "Lonely Star" - 7:49
 "Wee, Too" - 7:37
 "Tan Gaugin" - 6:16
 "Cherokee" (Ray Noble) - 6:45
 "Bevan Beeps" (Tadd Dameron) - 5:05

Personnel 
Chet Baker - flugelhorn
George Coleman - tenor saxophone
Kirk Lightsey - piano
Herman Wright - bass
Roy Brooks - drums

References 

Chet Baker albums
1966 albums
Prestige Records albums